Rexville or Reckville was an unincorporated area in Austin County, in the U.S. state of Texas. The former location of the community, now a ghost town, is in a rural area between Sealy in Austin County and Eagle Lake in Colorado County. The name Rexville is still used to identify a United States Geological Survey (USGS) quadrangle map.

Geography
There is a large Wal-Mart distribution center to the northeast at FM 3013 and Farm to Market Road 3538. Rexville Road starts near U.S. Route 90 in Sealy and crosses Interstate 10 at a bridge near Sealy High School. There is no interchange. A short distance southwest of the overpass, the pavement ends and Rexville Road becomes gravel-topped. On the 1960 Rexville USGS 7.5' Quadrangle, Rexville is marked on a railroad siding beside a gravel pit on the west side of East Bernard Creek.

History
The area was first settled by Anglo-Americans in the 1830s. In the 1880s, a spur line of the Gulf, Colorado and Santa Fe Railway was built between Sealy and Eagle Lake. Though the town became a flag stop on the railroad, few people moved there. The Rexville community never had a post office but got its mail from Sealy. By the 1950s there was nothing in the area but a triangulation station on the Atchison, Topeka and Santa Fe Railroad and a few farms. One source lists Rexville as a ghost town.

Gallery

References

See also

Populated places in Austin County, Texas
Unincorporated communities in Texas
Ghost towns in South Texas